Tian Xiuxiu (born 13 January 1996) is a Chinese handball player for Shandong Handball and the Chinese national team.

She competed at the 2015 World Women's Handball Championship in Denmark.

References

1996 births
Living people
Chinese female handball players